Swan Lake is a ballet by Russian composer Pyotr Ilyich Tchaikovsky. (1875-1876)

Swan Lake may also refer to:

Arts

Ballet 
 Swan Lake (1895), Imperial Ballet in St. Petersburg, Russia; the version on which many companies base their stagings, both choreographically and musically
 Swan Lake (Balanchine), a 1951 one-act ballet produced by George Balanchine
 Swan Lake (Bourne), a 1995 ballet produced by Matthew Bourne

Film 
 Swan Lake (1981 film), an animated film directed by Hirokazu Fuse

Music 
 Swan Lake (band), a Canadian indie supergroup
 "Swan Lake" (The Cats song), a 1968 hit by The Cats
 Swan Lake, alternate title for "Death Disco", a 1979 song by Public Image Ltd.

Places

Canada 
 Swan Lake 29, a First Nations reserve in Kenora District, Ontario
 Swan Lake (Manitoba), a lake in Division No. 19, Manitoba
 Swan Lake, Manitoba, a community in the Rural Municipality of Lorne
 Swan Lake (Okanagan), a lake in the Southern Interior of British Columbia
 Swan Lake (Saanich), a district municipality on Vancouver Island in British Columbia
 Swan Lake (Timiskaming District), a lake in Lee and Maisonville Townships
 Swan Lake Provincial Park, a provincial park in British Columbia
 Mont du Lac des Cygnes (Swan Lake Mountain), a mountain in Charlevoix, Quebec

United States

Lakes and wetlands
 Swan Lake (Alaska), in the town of Sitka
 Swan Lake, a lake in Crittenden County, Arkansas
 Swan Lake, a lake in Cross County, Arkansas
 Swan Lake, four different lakes in Desha County, Arkansas
 Swan Lake, a lake in Jefferson County, Arkansas
 Swan Lake, a lake in Lafayette County, Arkansas
 Swan Lake, a lake in Lonoke County, Arkansas
 Swan Lake, a lake in Mississippi County, Arkansas
 Little Swan Lake, Warren County, Illinois
 Swan Lake (Carroll County, Iowa)
 Swan Lake (Emmet County, Iowa)
 Swan Lake (Kentucky), Ballard County
 Swan Lake (Maine), Waldo County
 Swan Lake (Nicollet County, Minnesota)
 Swan Lake (Montana), Bigfork, Montana
 Swan Lake National Wildlife Refuge, Chariton County, Missouri
 Swan Lake Nature Study Area, Lemmon Valley, Nevada
 Swan Lake (New York), the source of the Swan River on Long Island
 Swan Lake/Iris Gardens, Sumter, South Carolina
 Swan Lake (South Dakota), Turner County
 A few other lakes in South Dakota

Inhabited places
 Swan Lake, Mississippi, an unincorporated community in Tallahatchie County, Mississippi, United States
 Swan Lake, Montana, an unincorporated community in Lake County, Montana, United States
 Swan Lake, New York, a hamlet in Sullivan County
 Swan Lake, Tulsa, a historic district in Tulsa, Oklahoma
 Swan Lake Township, Emmet County, Iowa
 Swan Lake Township, Stevens County, Minnesota

Other places 
 Swan Lake, in Yerevan, Armenia
 Swan Lake (New Zealand)
 Swan Lake (Singapore), Singapore Botanic Gardens
 Swan Lake Station (天鹅湖站, Tian'e Hu zhan), a station on the Linhe–Ceke railway in Inner Mongolia
 Schwansen, in Schleswig-Holstein, Germany
 Swan Lake, Curonian Spit National Park (Russia)

See also
 Barbie of Swan Lake, a 2003 CGI animated film
 Swan (disambiguation)
 Swan Lake, 1989 children's book by Mark Helprin
 Swan Lake, 1999 manga book by Higuchi Tachibana
 The Swan Princess, a 1994 animated film based on the ballet Swan Lake
 Swanlake, Idaho, an unincorporated community in Bannock County, Idaho, U.S.